Bajrayogini Temple(Nepali: बज्रयोगिनी मन्दिर) is a Tantric Buddhist temple located at Sakwa in Nepal's Kathmandu Valley. It is also well known as Bodhisattva's Temple.
The temple is actually a sort of temple complex, with the main temple having been built by King Pratap Malla in the sixteenth century. Vajrayogini is a Buddhist tantric deity, she is also conflated with Ugra Tara, a form of the Buddhist dharmapala Ekajati. However, the temple is sacred to both Buddhists and Hindus.

The Bajrayogini Temple is situated roughly 20 kilometres northeast of Kathmandu.  The area where it is located is often referred to as Gunbaha, which can be roughly translated from Newari as ‘recreational forest place’.  The main temple is a three-story high building, which was obviously carefully constructed with the utmost attention to detail. You will likely find a statue of the goddess Bajrayogini in this temple which will feature a red face with three eyes as well as hands, which have the thumb and middle finger carefully, decorated. Ornaments surround her statue.

Mythology 
According to a holy book, which was once discovered long ago, the site of the temple was once a forked piece of stone, which spouted fire. This was quite significant when the rest of the world was covered with snow and before long there emerged a five-colored flame, which came to be the volcanic goddess. The goddess ordered that a temple be built on the sight of her emergence and priests have been making use of the nine surrounding caves for centuries to serve this temple ever since. The first priest to serve here was supposedly given superior enlightenment and Bajrayogini is considered to be one of the wisest and strongest gods able to grant this gift. There is a beautiful water tap complete with decorative statue in the area, which dates back to the fourth century. The attraction here is not only the various temples but also the many other interesting temples and caves which surrounding it – some of which are considered to be older than the temple itself. Amongst the caves in the area is a carved double chamber with window attributed to being used by Marpa Lotsawa. Whereas nearby is a tiny chamber built into a small cliff which was where Milarepa was walled in for solitary retreat.

The hill top is accessed by a very long carved stone stairway. The entire site is covered richly with Newari architectural metal work, carved wood details, and ancient artifacts. Including a small stupa claimed to pre-date Buddha Shakyamuni.

2015 earthquake
The earthquake that struck on 25 April 2015 had immense effect on Sankhu. Bajrayogini temple was no exception. The temple was not marked safe by the engineers. Renovation of the temple is necessary in order to assure safety. The statues of Bajrayogini temple are safely shifted and the temple is supported with wooden planks.

Gallery

Sources

External links

 Vajrayogini and early settlement of sankhu UNESCO World Heritage List

See also

 Bajrayogini
 Cakrasaṃvara Tantra
 Nepal earthquake
 Sankhu

Newar Buddhism
Buddhist temples in Nepal
Vajrayogini temples
Hindu temples in Kathmandu District
Vajrayana
16th-century establishments in Nepal